The Haverstraw Tunnel is an early black and white silent film released in 1897 by the American Mutoscope Company.  It is considered to be one of the first examples of a phantom ride (along with Alexandre Promio's Leaving Jerusalem by Railway the same year) and features a train travelling along the West Shore Railroad in Rockland County, New York and then through the eponymous tunnel.

Reception 
The Haverstraw Tunnel became one of Mutoscope's most popular films.  A review of the film was published in a February 1, 1898 Worcester, Massachusetts newspaper that mentioned:

A review appeared in the January 22, 1898 Tatler of St. Augustine, Florida and commented on the effect the film had upon audiences at the Hotel Alcazar at the time:

References

External links
 

Documentary films about rail transport
Black-and-white documentary films
Films shot in New York (state)
American silent short films
1890s short documentary films
Films set in New York (state)
American black-and-white films
Films set on trains
American short documentary films